Payal Jain is an Indian fashion designer.

Early life
Jain was born in New Delhi and graduated summa-cum-laude in 1993 from Fashion Institute of Design and Merchandising, California.

Career 
She returned to India to work. She designed corporate dressing for The Leela, Goa in 1993. She later designed for over 40 hotels. She participated in various international fashion shows including in Toronto. Payal Jain's all-time favorite inspiration is Else Shiaparelli (1890-1973) an Italian Couturiere.

References

Living people
Indian women fashion designers
Women artists from Delhi
21st-century Indian Jains
Year of birth missing (living people)